was a Japanese Nihonga artist.

Biography 
His birth name was Sannosuke Dōmoto. At a young age, he started working for Heizo Tatsumura I. At the age of 28, he was exhibited with his work "Landscape of Fukakusa". His 1961 "Symphony" is considered one of his most famous paintings. 

Dōmoto painted 600 interior screens and ceilings for Buddhist temples and shrines, amongst them Tōfuku-ji in Kyoto's Higashiyama district. In 1933 he painted the large and vivid "Blue Dragon" ceiling painting for one of the halls. He painted it in 17 days. 

He received a commission from the monastery Chishaku-in, that has a garden said to be a favourite of Sen no Rikyū, to paint new sliding doors facing it. "Ladies at Tea" from 1958 shows a more western-style painting of two women enjoying tea. The left side is a woman in kimono, while the lady to the right is in western dress. The four sliding doors were a departure from the traditional style.

Dōmoto received a commission from the temple Hōnen-in for two rooms. Normally the rooms had paintings by the Kano school. Two rooms that he painted in 1971 "Soft breeze approaching" depict the Pure Land. An abstract painting, it shows willows or trees swaying in the wind.

He also designed furoshiki fabrics. Initially they were of designs that did not use much colour, but as the colour dying techniques evolved, towards the end of his life he designed more colourful designs.

School 
When he was 45 years old, he established a painting school which still exists today. One of the teachers there is Nihonga painter Masaki Ukai. 

The Inshō Dōmoto Art Museum in Kyoto is dedicated to his work and regularly holds exhibitions about him and other painters.

Awards 
He was made an Imperial Household Artist in 1944 and received the Order of Culture in 1961.

References

External links
Inshō Dōmoto Art Museum Homepage

1891 births
1975 deaths
20th-century Japanese painters
Kyoto City University of Arts alumni
Nihonga painters
Buddhist artists
Artists from Kyoto
Imperial household artists